The King Alfonso XIII's Cup 1930 was the 30th staging of the Copa del Rey, the Spanish football cup competition.

The competition started on April 6, 1930, and concluded on June 1, 1930, with the final, held at the Montjuïch Stadium in Barcelona. Athletic Bilbao won their tenth title.

Teams
Andalusia: Sevilla FC, Real Betis
Aragon: Iberia SC, Patria Aragón
Asturias: Real Oviedo, Sporting de Gijón
Balearic Islands: CD Alfonso XIII
Canary Islands: Real Club Victoria
Cantabria: Racing de Santander, Gimnástica de Torrelavega
Castile and León: Cultural y Deportiva Leonesa, Real Valladolid
Catalonia: FC Barcelona, CD Europa, RCD Español
Extremadura: CD Don Benito
Galicia: Celta de Vigo, Racing de Ferrol
Gipuzkoa: Real Unión, Real Sociedad, CA Osasuna
Murcia: Real Murcia, Cartagena FC
Centre Region: Real Madrid, Athletic Madrid, Racing de Madrid
Valencia: Valencia CF, CD Castellón
Biscay: Athletic Bilbao, CD Alavés, Arenas Club de Getxo

Round of 32
The first leg was played on April 6. The second leg was played on April 13.

|}
Real Betis received a bye.

Tiebreaker

|}

Round of 16
The first leg was played on April 20. The second leg was played on April 27.

|}

Quarter-finals
The first leg was played on May 4. The second leg was played on May 11.

|}

Semi-finals
The first leg was played on May 18. The second leg was played on May 25.

|}
Tiebreaker
Played on May 27 in Zaragoza.

|}

Final

Notes

References
linguasport.com 
RSSSF.com

1930
1930 domestic association football cups
Copa